Aptostichus miwok is a species of spiders in the family Euctenizidae named after the Coast Miwok Indian tribe known to have inhabited the coastal areas of California from the Golden Gate northward prior to European settlement. It is similar to the   Aptostichus angelinajolieae  named after  actress Angelina Jolie and Aptostichus stephencolberti named after satirist Stephen Colbert described by the same author.

References

Euctenizidae
Endemic fauna of California
Spiders of the United States
Fauna of the California chaparral and woodlands
Natural history of the California Coast Ranges
Natural history of the San Francisco Bay Area
Spiders described in 2008
Fauna without expected TNC conservation status